Ryan Donald Feltner (born September 2, 1996) is an American professional baseball pitcher for the Colorado Rockies of Major League Baseball (MLB). He made his MLB debut in 2021.

Amateur career
Feltner attended Walsh Jesuit High School in Cuyahoga Falls, Ohio. As a senior in 2015, he was the Gatorade Baseball Player of the Year for Ohio and was The Plain Dealer Baseball Pitcher of the Year. Feltner was drafted by the Toronto Blue Jays in the 25th round of the 2015 Major League Baseball draft, but did not sign and played college baseball at Ohio State University. In 2016, he played collegiate summer baseball with the Brewster Whitecaps of the Cape Cod Baseball League, and returned to the league in 2017 with the Bourne Braves, where he was named a league all-star. After his junior year at Ohio State, he was drafted by the Colorado Rockies in the fourth round of the 2018 MLB draft.

Professional career
Feltner made his professional debut with the Grand Junction Rockies and pitched 2019 with the Asheville Tourists. He did not play a minor league game in 2020 since the season was cancelled due to the COVID-19 pandemic. Feltner started 2021 with the Spokane Indians before being promoted to the Hartford Yard Goats.

On September 5, 2021, Feltner was selected to the 40-man roster and promoted to the major leagues for the first time. That day, he made his MLB debut, taking the loss after allowing 6 earned runs, including a game-winning solo home run by Ozzie Albies off Feltner's first major league pitch, in 2.2 innings of work in a 9–2 loss to the Atlanta Braves.

References

External links

1996 births
Living people
Baseball players from Orlando, Florida
Major League Baseball pitchers
Colorado Rockies players
Ohio State Buckeyes baseball players
Brewster Whitecaps players
Bourne Braves players
Grand Junction Rockies players
Asheville Tourists players
Spokane Indians players
Hartford Yard Goats players